Environmental oxygenation can be important to the sustainability of a particular ecosystem. Insufficient oxygen (environmental hypoxia) may occur in bodies of water such as ponds and rivers, tending to suppress the presence of aerobic organisms such as fish. Deoxygenation increases the relative population of anaerobic organisms such as plants and some bacteria, resulting in fish kills and other adverse events. The net effect is to alter the balance of nature by increasing the concentration of anaerobic over aerobic species.

Oxygenation by water aeration can be part of the environmental remediation of a usually stagnant body of water. For example, Bubbly Creek in Chicago, Illinois, was hypoxic (deficient in oxygen) due to its use as an open sewer by Chicago's meat packing industry but has been oxygenated (made more oxic) by introducing compressed air into its waters, increasing the fish population. A similar technique has previously been used in the Thames.

Dissolved oxygen (DO) is measured in standard solution units such as millilitres O2 per litre (mL/L), millimoles O2 per litre (mmol/L), milligrams O2 per litre (mg/L) and moles O2 per cubic meter (mol/m3).  For example, in freshwater under atmospheric pressure at 20 °C, O2 saturation is 9.1 mg/L.

In aquatic environments, oxygen saturation is a relative measure of the amount of oxygen (O2) dissolved in the water compared to equilibrium conditions.

Supersaturation of oxygen (i.e. saturation levels above 100%) can occur naturally. The most common cause is oxygen production by photosynthetically active species such as plants and algae. According to Henry's law, the equilibrium oxygen concentration is proportional to the partial pressure of oxygen gas. As air contains about 21% oxygen the equilibrium concentration of pure oxygen gas corresponds to nearly 500% air saturation. The other reason is that the oxygen concentration can be slow to adjust to changes in the environment. A rapid increase in temperature can reduce the equilibrium concentration of oxygen to a value below the actual concentration in the water, giving raise to more than 100% saturation until the system has had time to equilibrate through diffusion. Supersaturation can sometimes be harmful for organisms and cause decompression sickness.

Solubility tables (based upon temperature) and corrections for different salinities and pressures can be found at the USGS web site. Tables such as these of DO in millilitres per litre (mL/L) are based upon empirical equations that have been worked out and tested:

where ln is the symbol for natural logarithm and the coefficients take the following values:

Measurement

DO levels are typically measured using "rugged dissolved oxygen" (RDO) equipment which measures luminescence quenching ability of a sample. Increased oxygen levels result in increased quenching which is well characterised and allows accurate measurements to be made with a probe which requires minimal maintenance. Prior to the development of RDO technology membrane redox technology was used which measured oxygen levels using a clark electrode. Electrochemical equipment requires considerable maintenance to remove fouling and prevent degradation of the membrane.

For small or low concentration (less than 2 ppm) samples RDO equipment is significantly better as it does not consume oxygen in the sample (and therefore does not require stirring) or struggle to measure zero-levels.

Wet chemistry methods such as the Winkler test for dissolved oxygen can also be used for DO measurement but as with all wet chemistry measurements these require a skilled technician to obtain accurate results.

See also
Oxygenate
Streeter-Phelps equation

References

External links
Dissolved Oxygen Explained
Engineering Toolbox - Oxygen Solubility in Fresh Water and Sea Water

Hydrology

ca:Oxigenació